Soules is a surname. People with the surname include:

Chris Soules (born 1981), American reality television personality and farmer
Dale Soules (born 1946), American actress 
Olivier Soules (born 1967), French tennis player
William Soules (born 1955), American politician

See also
Soules (automobile), automotive company founded in Grand Rapids, Michigan in 1905
Soules College of Business at the University of Texas at Tyler
William II de Soules (d. 1320/1321), Lord of Liddesdale and Butler of Scotland
John de Soules (disambiguation)
Soule (disambiguation)
Souls (disambiguation)
Soles (disambiguation)